The 23rd International 500-Mile Sweepstakes Race was held at the Indianapolis Motor Speedway on Thursday, May 30, 1935. Despite attempts to improve participant safety by requiring crash helmets and installing green and yellow lights around the track, the event that year would prove to be one of the worst in terms of fatalities.

Kelly Petillo won the race, accompanied by riding mechanic Jimmy Dunham. Pete DePaolo, the 1925 winner, was the team principal, becoming the first individual to win the race separately as a driver and an owner.

The race was part of the 1935 AAA Championship Car season.

Pre-race and qualifying
Ten-lap (25 mile) qualifying runs were utilized.

On May 21, nine days before the race, three prospective participants lost their lives. Rookie Johnny Hannon, on just his first lap at racing speed, had his car go over the outside retaining wall and was killed from a fractured skull. Later that day, driver Hartwell "Stubby" Stubblefield also had his car go over the outside wall, and both he and his riding mechanic Leo Whitaker died from injuries they received being thrown from the vehicle. Kelly Petillo, the eventual winner, had his own difficulties getting into the field. His initial qualifying run (a record-breaking 121.687 mph) was voided when his car was ruled to have exceeded the fuel limit. Returning to the track, he had an engine blow, before finally having a qualifying run of 115.095 that placed him 22nd in the field.

Race
Driver Clay Weatherly would beg Leon Duray, the owner of Hannon's crashed car, to allow him to drive it in the race. The car would prove no luckier for Weatherly, who would be killed when the car crashed through the inner guard rail coming out of turn four on lap nine. Rex Mays would lead most of the first  before being forced out with mechanical failure. Petillo had climbed to second, and after Mays' departure led most of the remainder other than briefly following a pit stop. Petillo easily broke the record for the fastest average speed (106.240 mph) despite being slowed somewhat by rain near the end of the race. Petillo received approximately $33,000 in winnings for the race.

Aftermath
The driver deaths in 1935 caused the Speedway to develop a program to test rookie drivers which was instituted in 1936. Adjustments were also made to the configuration of the turns. Petillo would race in five more 500s, never again finishing higher than 18th. Six of the thirty-three drivers who started the race would end up having their lives ended in accidents at the Indy Speedway.

Results

Alternates
First alternate: Dave Evans

Failed to Qualify

Emil Andres  (#52, #56)
Herb Ardinger (#24)
George Barringer (#23)
L. L. Corum (#49)
Wesley Crawford (#48)
Dusty Fahrnow (#53)
Johnny Hannon  (#45) - Fatal accident
Gene Haustein (#28)
Harry Hunt  (#25)
Herschell McKee  (#51)
Zeke Meyer (#31)
Duke Nalon  - Withdrew
Floyd O'Neal  (#57)
Roy Painter  (#51)
Johnny Rae  (#47)
Johnny Sawyer (#63)
Phil Shafer (#31)
Overton Snell  (#58)
Stubby Stubblefield (#29) - Fatal accident
Doc Williams  (#64)
Robert Wilson  (#59)
Billy Winn (#10)

Race details
For 1935, riding mechanics were required.

References

Indianapolis 500 races
Indianapolis 500
Indianapolis 500
1935 in American motorsport